The 2016 St. George Illawarra Dragons season is the 18th in the joint venture club's history. The Dragons will compete in the NRL's 2016 Telstra Premiership season.

Gains And Losses of Squad 2016

Players

Ladder

References

St. George Illawarra Dragons seasons
St. George Illawarra Dragons season